Aritmija may refer to:

 Aritmija (novel), a 2004 novel by the Slovenian author Jani Virk
 Aritmija (album), a 2006 album by the Croatian band Vatra